Frea subcostata is a species of beetle in the family Cerambycidae. It was described by Kolbe in 1891.

References

subcostata
Beetles described in 1891